The June 2013 Srinagar attack was an attack on an Indian army convoy by militants in the area of Srinagar, Jammu and Kashmir, India, in which eight jawans were killed.

The attack took place near Hyderpora when army trucks were travelling from Leh on the Baramullah-Jammu National highway.
The attack came a day ahead of Prime Minister Manmohan Singh's visit to Srinagar.

References 

Srinagar
June 2013 events in India
2013 murders in India
Mass murder in 2013
Crime in Jammu and Kashmir